Carlos Almeida may refer to:
 Carlos Almeida (basketball) (born 1976), Angolan basketball shooting guard
 Carlos Almeida (politician), Indian politician from the state of Goa
 Carlos Almeida (swimmer) (born 1988), Portuguese swimmer
 Carlos Almeida (athlete) (born 1968), Cape Verdean long-distance runner
 Carlos Alberto de Almeida (born 1980), Brazilian footballer
 Carlos de Almeida (born 1969), Brazilian Olympic rower